Sharon Elizabeth Lee (born 1976) is a female retired British sport shooter.

Sport shooting career
She represented England in the 50 metres rifle prone at the 1998 Commonwealth Games in Kuala Lumpur, Malaysia. A second Games appearance eight years later in 2006 resulted in winning a silver medal in the same event with Helen Spittles.

References

1976 births
Living people
British female sport shooters
Commonwealth Games medallists in shooting
Commonwealth Games silver medallists for England
Shooters at the 1998 Commonwealth Games
Shooters at the 2006 Commonwealth Games
20th-century British women
21st-century British women
Medallists at the 2006 Commonwealth Games